Frand can mean:

 Fair, Reasonable and Non-Discriminatory (FRAND) licensing, also known as reasonable and non-discriminatory licensing
 Rabbi Yissocher Frand, American Orthodox rabbi and author